Barbara Ann Kipfer (born 1954) is a lexicographer, linguist, ontologist, and part-time archaeologist. She has written more than 80 books and calendars, including 14,000 Things to be Happy About (Workman), which has more than 1.25 million copies in print. The 25th anniversary edition of the book was published in 2014. She is the editor of Roget's International Thesaurus 5th-8th editions.

Kipfer holds an MPhil and PhD in linguistics (University of Exeter), a PhD in archaeology (Greenwich University), an MA and PhD in Buddhist Studies (Akamai University), and a BS in Physical Education (Valparaiso University). She is a Registered Professional Archaeologist.

Kipfer is senior lexicographer of Zeta Global.

Works
 Roget's International Thesaurus, New York: HarperCollins; 8th Ed., 2019
 The Happiness Diary, Beverly MA: Fair Winds, 2019
 Natural Meditation, New York: Helios, July 2018
 1,001 Ways to Be Creative, Washington DC: National Geographic, 2018
 1,001 Ways to Slow Down, Washington DC: National Geographic, 2017
 Color Your Happy Home with Durell Godfrey, New York: Harlequin, 2017
 How Would Buddha Think?, San Francisco: New Harbinger, 2016
 14,000 Things to be Happy About Page a Day Calendar 2017, New York: Workman, 2016
 1,001 Ways to Live Wild, Washington DC: National Geographic Books, 2016
 How Would Buddha Act?, San Francisco: New Harbinger, 2016
 What Would Buddha Say?. New Harbinger, 2014.
 Breath Perception. Skyhorse, 2014, .
 It's Good to Talk: More Than 10,000 Questions to Ask and Think About (e-book). 2013.
 A Commonplace Book (e-book). 2012.
 Smiles: 8,000 Sunny-Side-Up Thoughts (e-book). 2012.
 Good Nature (e-book). 2011.
 Life Needs a Menu: A Foodie List (e-book). 2011.
 The Culinarian: A Kitchen Desk Reference. Houghton Mifflin Harcourt, 2011, 
 Introduction to Lexicography (e-book). 2010.
 Kipfer's Lists (e-book). 2010.
 Things for Kids to Do (e-book). 2010.
 The Next Order of Things: Cycles, Sequences, & Processes (e-book). 2010.
 The Buddha's Lists (e-book). 2008.
 Time Capsule: Things to be Nostalgic About (e-book). 2008.
 Instant Karma. Workman, 2003, .
 Roget’s Descriptive Word Finder. Writer's Digest, 2003.
 Roget’s Thesaurus of Phrases. Writer's Digest, 2001.
 8,789 Words of Wisdom. Workman, 2001, .
 Flip Dictionary. Writer's Digest, 2000.
 Encyclopedic Dictionary of Archaeology. Springer, 2000.
 5,001 Things for Kids to Do. Plume, 2000.
 The Wish List. Workman, 1997, .
 The Order of Things. Random House, 1997.
A reference compilation outlining its contents in thirteen areas of classification; it contains schematic illustrations, dates, and numerous lists.
 USA Today Crossword Puzzle Dictionary. Hyperion, 1996.
 Dictionary of American Slang, contributor to 3rd edition, HarperCollins, 1995, .
 1,400 Things for Kids to be Happy About. Workman, 1994, .
 Bartlett's Book of Business Quotations. Little, Brown, 1994, .
 Bartlett's Book of Love Quotations. Little, Brown, 1994, .
 Sisson's Word and Expression Locater, revised 2nd edition. Prentice-Hall, 1994, .
 21st Century Manual of Style. Dell/Laurel, 1993, .
 21st Century Spelling Dictionary. Dell/Laurel, 1993, .
 21st Century Synonym and Antonym Finder. Dell/Laurel, 1993, .
 Random House Kid’s Encyclopedia. Knowledge Adventure, 1993
 Roget's 21st Century Thesaurus in Dictionary Form. Dell, 1992, .
 14,000 Things to be Happy About. Workman, 1990, .
 Workbook on Lexicography. University of Exeter Press, 1984, .

References

External links
Things to Be Happy About
Reference Wordsmith
Barbara Ann Kipfer art

1954 births
Living people
Linguists from the United States
American lexicographers
Women linguists
Women lexicographers
American women non-fiction writers
21st-century American women